Emam Saheb may refer to:
Emam Saheb, Jowzjan, Afghanistan
Emam Sahib, Kunduz, Afghanistan